In mathematics, a twisted cubic is a smooth, rational curve C of degree three in projective 3-space P3. It is a fundamental example of a skew curve. It is essentially unique, up to projective transformation (the twisted cubic, therefore). In algebraic geometry, the twisted cubic is a simple example of a projective variety that is not linear or a hypersurface, in fact not a complete intersection. It is the three-dimensional case of the rational normal curve, and is the image of a Veronese map of degree three on the projective line.

Definition

The twisted cubic is most easily given parametrically as the image of the map

which assigns to the homogeneous coordinate  the value

In one coordinate patch of projective space, the map is simply the moment curve

That is, it is the closure by a single point at infinity of the affine curve .

The twisted cubic is a projective variety, defined as the intersection of three quadrics. In homogeneous coordinates  on P3, the twisted cubic is the closed subscheme defined by the vanishing of the three homogeneous polynomials

It may be checked that these three quadratic forms vanish identically when using the explicit parameterization above; that is, substitute x3 for X, and so on.

More strongly, the homogeneous ideal of the twisted cubic C is generated by these three homogeneous polynomials of degree 2.

Properties
The twisted cubic has the following properties:
(An attempt to use only two polynomials make the resulting ideal not radical, since   is in it, but  is not).
 Any four points on C span P3.
 Given six points in P3 with no four coplanar, there is a unique twisted cubic passing through them.
 The union of the tangent and secant lines (the secant variety) of a twisted cubic C fill up P3 and the lines are pairwise disjoint, except at points of the curve itself.  In fact, the union of the tangent and secant lines of any non-planar smooth algebraic curve is three-dimensional. Further, any smooth algebraic variety with the property that every length four subscheme spans P3 has the property that the tangent and secant lines are pairwise disjoint, except at points of the variety itself.
 The projection of C onto a plane from a point on a tangent line of C yields a cuspidal cubic.
 The projection from a point on a secant line of C yields a nodal cubic.
 The projection from a point on C yields a conic section.

References
.

Algebraic curves